xoxo is a 2016 American drama film directed by Christopher Louie and starring Sarah Hyland, Graham Phillips, Brett DelBuono, Hayley Kiyoko, Colin Woodell, Ryan Hansen, Ione Skye, and Chris D'Elia. It is based on a story by Louie and is written by Dylan Meyer. It was produced by Joe Russell, Christopher Louie, Daniel Shafer and Max Leitman and released on August 26, 2016, by Netflix.

Premise

The lives of six strangers collide during a frenetic night of romance and dream chasing when a young DJ is given a chance to perform at a festival.

Cast
 Sarah Hyland as Krystal
 Graham Phillips as Ethan
 Brett DelBuono as Tariq
 Hayley Kiyoko as Shanni
 Colin Woodell as Ray
 Ryan Hansen as Avilo
 Ione Skye as Ethan's Mom
 Chris D'Elia as Neil
 Ian Anthony Dale as Anders
 Henry Zaga as Jordan
 LaMonica Garret as Chopper
 Brianne Howey as Darla
 Medalion Rahimi as Nikki
 Sam Aotaki as Chelsea
 Peter Gilroy as Jayce
 Scotty Dickert as Bo/Drug guy
 Marci Miller as Alien girl
 Christopher Foley as Brock
 Brett Davis as Vince
 Lars Slind as Chad
Kenajuan Bentley as Joe
Laird Macintosh as Mr. Henderson
Joe Russell as Sound Tech
Alex Rich as Nice Raver Guy
Keelin Woodell as Cuddle Puddle Girl
Casey Strand as Secretary
Kelly Marie Tran as Butterfly Rave Girl

Music

Soundtrack

Production
In July 2015, it was announced Sarah Hyland, Chris D'Elia, and Graham Phillips, had joined the cast of the film, with Dylan Meyer writing the screenplay, while Netflix will produce and distribute the film. That same month, Hayley Kiyoko and Colin Woodell joined the cast of the film, while Christopher Louie wrote the story and directed the film. In June 2016, Pete Tong 
joined the film as a producer and music supervisor.

Sarah Hyland and Graham Phillips have confirmed that XOXO was filmed in multiple music festivals and raves around Los Angeles.

Release
XOXO was made available through Netflix on August 26, 2016.  It ran for one week at the Laemmle Royal theater in Los Angeles August 24 through August 31.

Reception
On review aggregator Rotten Tomatoes, the film holds an approval rating of 71% based on 7 reviews, with an average rating of 5.81/10. Nick Murray opined in The Village Voice that the film "may be as predictable as an EDM song, but it too offers pleasures to those willing to give themselves over to its rhythms."

References

External links
 
 

2016 films
American drama films
American independent films
English-language Netflix original films
2016 drama films
2016 independent films
2010s English-language films
2010s American films
English-language drama films